Shabash Bangladesh (Bravo Bangladesh) is a sculpture in Bangladesh. It is located at Rajshahi University premises. Shabash Bangladesh is another state of the art sculpture created to pay tribute to those killed in the Liberation War of Bangladesh.

Nitun Kundu is the sculptor of Shabash Bangladesh. The name of the sculpture comes from a poem named "Durmor" by Sukanta Bhattacharya. The last four lines of which is engraved under the structure:

Translation :

Gallery

References

Monuments and memorials in Bangladesh
Aftermath of the Bangladesh Liberation War